During the 2000–01 season, the Guildford Flames participated in the British National League. It was the 9th year of Ice Hockey played by the Flames. It was an amazing season for the Guildford Flames that saw them win the British National League, Findus playoffs and ntl Christmas Cup. They also reached the Final of the Benson & Hedges plate, but lost 3–2 to the Basingstoke Bison at the Sheffield Arena in front of an estimated 6,000 spectators.

Guildford retired two players' jerseys in the 2000–2001 season. The first to be raised to the rafters of the Guildford Spectrum was that of their first Canadian star – No. 11 Fred Perlini. Ryan Campbell's No. 10 shirt was also retired when he returned to Canada at the end of the season. Along with an influential playing career for the Flames he was also their first commercial manager.

Player statistics

Netminders

Results

Challenge

British National League (BNL)

Play-offs 
The loss to Peterborough on 17 March ended a run of 24 straight Flames victories, a club and BNL record.

Benson and Hedges Cup (formerly Autumn Cup) 
Eight Superleague teams and nine British National League teams entered the first round. The Superleague sides competed in Group A & B, while the BNL teams made up groups C & D. This was followed by a challenge round which matched the last placed Superleague team in each group against the BNL sides leading their groups. The winners went into the Cup quarter-finals and the losers into the Plate competition.

Benson and Hedges Plate

ntl: Christmas Cup

References

External links 
 Official Guildford Flames website

Guildford Flames seasons
Gui

fr:Guildford Flames